Surrey-Guildford is a provincial electoral district for the Legislative Assembly of British Columbia, Canada, that was created in the 2015 redistribution from parts of Surrey-Tynehead and Surrey-Whalley. It was first contested in the 2017 election. Surrey-Guildford consists of a large part of what used to be Surrey-Tynehead, a provincial riding that was held by the BC Liberals since Dave Hayer was first elected in 2001, and then re-elected in 2005 and 2009.

Geography 
The district is named after the Surrey neighbourhood of Guildford.

Demographics 
Source:

MLAs
This riding has elected the following Members of Legislative Assembly:

Election results

External links 
Hi-Res Map (pdf

References

Politics of Surrey, British Columbia
British Columbia provincial electoral districts